Danny Smith may refer to:

Danny Smith (footballer) (1921–1998), Scottish
Danny Smith (athlete) (born 1952), Olympic sprinter
Danny Smith (coach) (born 1953), for the Pittsburgh Steelers
Danny Smith (writer) (born 1959), on TV show Family Guy 
Danny Smith (actor) (born 1973), Canadian

See also
Daniel Smith (disambiguation)
Dan Smith (disambiguation)
Danny Smythe (1948–2016), American drummer for The Box Tops